Berkeley Heights is an active commuter railroad train station in the borough of Berkeley Heights, Union County, New Jersey. Operated by New Jersey Transit, the station services trains on the Gladstone Branch between Summit and Gladstone.

History 
Berkeley Heights station opened on January 29, 1872, with the opening of the New Jersey West Line Railroad from Summit to Bernardsville. The Delaware, Lackawanna and Western Railroad built the current station depot in 1899. The station retained agent services until 1960.

Station layout
The station has one low-level side platform, two tracks, and a standing station depot. The station is not compliant with the Americans with Disabilities Act of 1990.

References

External links

 Station from Plainfield Avenue from Google Maps Street View

NJ Transit Rail Operations stations
Former Delaware, Lackawanna and Western Railroad stations
Railway stations in the United States opened in 1872
1872 establishments in New Jersey